Elektronika Central Scientific Research Institute is a company based in Moscow, Russia. It is part of the Rostec holding.

Elektronika is responsible for providing information services to the electronics industry, as well as services involving the operation of control instruments and equipment for technological processes, laboratory equipment, measuring devices, and computer facilities. It also produces a variety of lasers and emitters.

References

External links
 Official website

Research institutes in Russia
Companies based in Moscow
Rostec
Ministry of the Electronics Industry (Soviet Union)
Research institutes in the Soviet Union
Research institutes established in 1964
1964 establishments in the Soviet Union